Sonu Chandrapal  is an Indian television actress. She made her acting debut with Tujh Sang Preet Lagai Sajna portraying Nisha in 2013. Chandrapal is best known for her role as Ragini Saurabh Birla in Suhani Si Ek Ladkiand Goddess Saraswati in Shrimad Bhagwat Mahapuran. She had previously acted in Gujarati and South Indian films.

She was born in Ahmedabad, Gujarat and currently stays in Mumbai.

Filmography

Television

Films
Wassup zindagi Gujarati film (2017) as Shama

References

External links

Living people
Indian film actresses
Indian television actresses